Santiam Junction is a highway junction and unincorporated community in Linn County, Oregon, United States, at the intersection of  U.S. Route 20/Oregon Route 126 and Oregon Route 22.

According to the Oregon Department of Transportation, the elevation is 3,750 feet (1,143 m).

An automated weather station is located here, as well as highway maintenance facilities. The Santiam Junction State Airport is an emergency/recreational landing strip that is closed from the first snowfall until spring. The airport grounds permit fly-in camping.

Geologically, much of the area is a lava bed created during a period of volcanic activity around 1000 B.C.

Climate
Santiam Junction experiences a dry-summer humid continental climate (Köppen Dsb) with warm, dry summers and cold, wet winters with heavy snow and rain.

See also
 Hogg Rock
 Santiam Pass
 Hoodoo (ski area)

References

External links
Weather station info

Unincorporated communities in Linn County, Oregon
Unincorporated communities in Oregon